Tapiwa Zivira is a Zimbabwean digital journalist who works for Alpha Media Holdings, the biggest independent media house in Zimbabwe. He started his career at the time when the Robert Mugabe government was at the height of cracking down on the independent press.

In March 2007, as an intern, he wrote an account describing the death of Gift Tandare, an opposition Movement for Democratic Change – Tsvangirai activist who was shot by police while demonstrating in the high-density suburb of Highfield, Harare.

In 2009 Zivira was part of the team that produced the report If something is wrong and the documentary House of Justice on the abuse of farm workers during the land reform programme and the atrocities committed by the government of Robert Mugabe on the farm workers.

References

Living people
1985 births